The Buick V6,
was an OHV V6 engine developed by the Buick division of General Motors and introduced in 1962. Originally  and initially marketed as Fireball, it later became popularly referred to as the 3800 for its various  incarnations.

The 3800 was on the Ward's 10 Best Engines of the 20th century list, made Ward's yearly 10 Best list multiple times, and is one of the most-produced engines in history. To date, over 25 million have been produced.

It is a derivative of Buick's  aluminium V8 family, which also went on to become the Rover V8, another engine with a very long life (1960–2006)

Overview
The block is made of cast iron and all use iron two-valve-per-cylinder OHV heads. The engine, originally designed and manufactured in the United States, was also produced in later versions in Australia. It was the first six-cylinder engine designed exclusively for Buick products since the Buick straight-six was discontinued in 1930.

In 1967, GM sold the design to Kaiser-Jeep. The muscle car era had taken hold, and GM no longer felt the need to produce a V6, considered an unusual engine configuration in North America at the time. The energy crisis a decade later prompted the company to buy the design back from American Motors (AMC), who had by that point bought Kaiser-Jeep, and the descendants of the early 231 continue to be the most-common GM V6 as it developed into a very durable and reliable design.

Though the pre-3800 rear-wheel drive (RWD) V6 uses the Buick, Oldsmobile, Pontiac (BOP) bellhousing pattern, an oddity of both the front-wheel drive (FWD) and RWD 3800 V6 is that although it is a 90° V6, it uses the GM 60° V6 bell housing (Metric Pattern). For use in the FWD applications, the bellhousings on the FWD transmissions are altered slightly.

This engine has the cylinders numbered 1-3-5 on the left-hand bank (front bank for FWD applications) and 2-4-6 on the right-hand bank, the number 1 cylinder being the furthest from the flywheel end. The firing order is 1-6-5-4-3-2.

The engine was produced at the Flint North plant in Flint, Michigan, with engine blocks and cylinder heads cast at the Grey Iron plant (now the GM Saginaw Metal Casting Operations plant) at 1629 N. Washington Avenue in Saginaw, Michigan.

Versions

Fireball V6
The first engine in this family was introduced in 1961 for the 1962 model year Buick Special with Buick's  engine, the first V6 in an American car (the GMC V6 was used earlier in trucks). Because it was derived from Buick's  aluminum V8, it has a 90° bank between cylinders and an uneven firing pattern due to the crankshaft having only three crank pins set at 120° apart, with opposing cylinders (1-2, 3-4 and 5-6) sharing a crank pin in, as do many V8 engines. The uneven firing pattern was often perceived as roughness, leading a former American Motors executive to describe it as "Rougher than a cob."

In 1977, Buick redesigned the crankshaft to a "split-pin" configuration to create an "even-firing" version. The crank pins associated with the opposing cylinders were offset from each other by 30°. The engine in this configuration became known to have "off-center bore spacing".

The off-center design continued up until the 1988 LN3 version of the engine, when the left-hand bank of cylinders was moved forward relative to the right-hand bank.

198
Buick Division, concerned about high manufacturing costs of their innovative aluminum 215 V8, sought to develop a cheaper, cast-iron engine based on the same tooling. They settled on an unusual 90° V6 layout that was essentially the architecture of the '215' less two cylinders. It weighed about  more than the aluminum engine, but was far cheaper to produce. Dubbed the Fireball V6, it became the standard engine in the 1962 Buick Special. In their test that year, Road & Track was impressed with Buick's "practical" new V6, saying it "sounds and performs exactly like the aluminum V8 in most respects."

225
This engine was used in Buick's intermediate-sized Special and Skylark models from 1964 to 1967 and Oldsmobile's mid-sized F-85/Cutlass models for 1964 and 1965, including the Oldsmobile Vista Cruiser and Buick Sport Wagon.

1964-1965 models featured a single barrel Rochester MonoJet, producing .

The V6 was dropped after the 1967 model year in favor of a conventional  inline-six engine built by the Chevrolet division, and the tooling was sold to Kaiser-Jeep.

Dauntless
In 1965, Kaiser-Jeep began using the Buick 225 in Jeep CJs. It was known as the Dauntless V6 and used a much heavier flywheel than the Buick version to damp vibrations resulting from the engine's firing pattern. Buick sold the tooling for this engine to Kaiser in 1967, as the demand for the engine was waning steadily in an era of V8s and muscle cars. When American Motors (AMC) bought Jeep, the V6 was replaced with AMC Straight-6 engines, but the ownership of the V6 tooling remained with AMC.

Applications:
 1966–1971 Jeep Jeepster & Jeepster Commando
 1966–1971 CJ-5
 1966–1971 CJ-6

231
The 1973 oil crisis prompted GM to look for more economical engines than the V8s of 350, 400 and 454/455 cubic inches that powered most General Motors cars and trucks during that time. At that time, the only "small" engines generally offered by GM were built by the Chevrolet division including the  OHC aluminum inline-four engine used in the subcompact Chevy Vega and a  straight-6 used in smaller Chevy, Buick, Oldsmobile and Pontiac models, whose design roots dated back to the 1962 Chevy II (Nova).

One quick idea was tried by Buick engineers — taking an old Fireball V6 picked up at a junkyard and installing it into a 1974 Buick Apollo. The solution worked so well that GM wanted AMC to put the engine back into production. However, AMC's cost per unit was deemed as too high. Instead of buying completed engines, GM made an offer to buy back the tooling and manufacturing line from AMC in April, 1974, and began building the engines on August 12. With production back within GM, Buick re-introduced the V6 that fall in certain 1975 models — a move made possible by the fact that foundations for the old V6 machinery were still intact at Buick's engine assembly plant in Flint, Michigan, so it was easy to put the old tooling back in place and begin production at least two years ahead of the normal schedule that would have been required to create new tooling.

Due to difficulties with the new fuel economy and emissions standards, the engine produced just .

 1975      Buick Apollo
 1975–1980 Buick Skyhawk
 1975–1977 Buick Century
 1975–1977 Buick Regal
 1975–1976 Buick LeSabre
 1975–1979 Buick Skylark
 1975-1982 Oldsmobile Cutlass
 1978–1981 Chevrolet Camaro
 1978–1987 Chevrolet El Camino
 1978–1983 Chevrolet Malibu Both the  engine used in the Malibu starting in 1980 and the  version first used in 1978 were NOT versions of the Buick 3800 Engine, but a different Chevy-built engine. Both the Buick V6 and the  Chevrolet V6 are 90-degree V6 engines, and both are often referred to as being a 3.8 L V6. These engines should not be confused as being the same, and are unique engine designs. The  Chevrolet V6 was essentially a small block Chevy V8 missing two cylinders. 
 1978–1987 Chevrolet Monte Carlo This is very confusing, as Monte Carlo at various times used both the V6 from the Buick engine as well as the V6 engine derived from the Chevrolet V8.
 1978–1980 Chevrolet Monza
 1978–1987 Oldsmobile Cutlass Supreme
 1975–1980 Oldsmobile Starfire
 1977–1979 Oldsmobile Omega
 1978–1987 Pontiac Grand Prix
 1976–1980 Pontiac Sunbird
 1976–1981 Pontiac Firebird
 1978–1981 Pontiac LeMans
 1977–1979 Pontiac Ventura

LD5

In 1978, GM began to market the 231 as the 3.8 liter as metric engine sizes became common in the United States. The RPO Code was LD5, though California-emissions versions were called LC6. Starting in 1979, the engine was used in the front-wheel drive Buick Riviera, though still with a longitudinal mounting. Larger valves and better intake and exhaust boosted the power output for 1979.

A turbocharged version was introduced as the pace car at the 1976 Indianapolis 500, and a production turbo arrived in 1978. The turbo 3.8 received sequential fuel injection and a wasted spark Distributorless Ignition System in 1984. In 1986 an air-to-air Garrett intercooler was added and the RPO Code became LC2. The limited production GNX benefitted from additional factory modifications such as a ceramic turbocharger, more efficient Garrett intercooler, low restriction exhaust system and revised programming which resulted in a  factory rating.

The turbo 3.8 liter was used in the following vehicles:
 1978–1987 Buick Regal Sport Coupe, T-Type, Grand National, and GNX
 1978–1980 Buick LeSabre Sport Coupe
 1979–1980 Buick Century Turbo Coupe & Sedan
 1979–1985 Buick Riviera S-Type, T-Type and less than 100 Convertibles
 1980–1981 Chevrolet Monte Carlo Turbo
 1989 Pontiac Trans Am Turbo 20th Anniversary Edition

The turbocharged 1987 Buick Regal Grand National GNX was called America's quickest automobile, and the model continues to be collected and appreciated today.

LC9
A smaller version of this engine was produced in 1978 and 1979 for the Century, Regal and Chevrolet Monza. The RPO code was LC9.

LC4
In response to rising gas prices, a larger  version of the 3.8 liter LD5 V6 was produced from 1980 through 1984 and marketed as an alternative to a V8. This engine was used in many large rear-wheel drive Buicks, and in some models from each of GM's other divisions, including Cadillac which offered the "big" Buick V6 in several models from 1980 to 1982 as a credit option to the troublesome V8-6-4 engine used in 1981 and early versions of the aluminum-block Cadillac HT-4100 V8 introduced in 1982. It was also the standard powerplant in the front-drive Riviera and Oldsmobile Toronado from 1981 to 1984. Additionally, the 4.1 block was used unsuccessfully at Indianapolis for racing. Its only weakness was the intake valve seals. This was the first naturally aspirated GM V-6 to feature a 4-barrel carburetor.

 1980–84 Buick Electra
 1980–84 Buick LeSabre
 1982–84 Buick Regal
 1981–84 Buick Riviera
 1980–82 Cadillac DeVille
 1981–82 Cadillac Eldorado
 1980–82 Cadillac Fleetwood
 1981–82 Cadillac Seville
 1981–83 Oldsmobile 98
 1981–84 Oldsmobile Toronado
 1982 Pontiac Grand Prix
 1982 Pontiac Bonneville

LK9 
A small  version of the Buick V6 was produced for GM's 1980s front-wheel drive cars. Introduced in 1982, it was a lower deck version of the 3.8 designed for transverse application in the new GM A platform cars such as the Buick Century and Oldsmobile Cutlass Ciera. It used a Rochester E2ME 2-bbl carburetor and the VIN code for the engine is E.

Applications:
 1982–1985 Buick Century
 1982–1985 Oldsmobile Cutlass Ciera
 1985 Oldsmobile 98
 1985 Buick Electra

LN7 
The LN7 is a multiport fuel injected version of the LK9. It was introduced for 1985 and used the VIN code: L. It was replaced in 1989 with the 3.3.

Applications:
 1986 Oldsmobile Delta 88
 1986 Buick LeSabre
 1986-1988 Buick Skylark
 1985-1987 Buick Somerset
 1985-1987 Pontiac Grand Am
 1985-1988 Oldsmobile Cutlass Calais

3.8 FWD LG2/LG3
In mid-1984, the 3.8 liter LD5 engine was modified for transverse-mounting in smaller, FWD vehicles, and equipped with multi point fuel injection (MPFI). 1984-1985 models used a distributor and a distributorless wasted spark ignition system was added for all engines produced in 1986 and later. In 1986, it received sequential fuel injection (SFI) and it was initially produced in two forms, the LG2 with flat lifters (tappets), and the LG3 with a roller camshaft and lifters. The latter was offered in various models through 1988. From 1986, the 3.8 had a revised, crankshaft-driven oil pump which eliminated a longstanding problem with pump housing wear and loss of prime. Power produced by this engine was:
 VIN code B (LG2): flat lifters (tappets)
  at 4,400 rpm,  at 2,000 rpm
 VIN code 3 (LG3): roller lifters (tappets)
  at 4,400 rpm,  at 2,000 rpm (1984–1985 MPFI)
  at 4,400 rpm,  at 2,200 rpm (1986–1988 SFI)

1984-1988 Buick Century
1986 Buick Riviera (LG2)
1987 Buick Riviera (LG3)
1986-1987 Buick LeSabre
1985-1987 Buick Electra
1984-1988 Oldsmobile Cutlass Ciera
1986-1987 Oldsmobile Delta 88
 1985-1987 Oldsmobile Ninety Eight
 1986-1987 Oldsmobile Toronado
 1987- Early 1988 Pontiac Bonneville

3800 V6

Pre-Series I

LN3 Naturally Aspirated

Introduced in 1988, the 3800 LN3 would later be loosely considered the Pre-Series I, although the older 3.8 SFI (LG3) was still available that year in some models. Designated initially by VIN code C, the multiport fuel injected 3800 LN3 was a major redesign, featuring changes such as a balance shaft, on-center bore spacing, use of a 3x/18x crank-trigger system, and other improvements. This generation continued in use in several GM products into the early 1990s.

The LN3 is very closely related to the Series I L27 and Series I L67 Supercharged. In fact, supercharger-related hardware can be fitted to an LN3 without changing the cylinder heads. However, the ECM would have to be reprogrammed. The L27 has a two piece, upper plenum intake and lower intake, the LN3 is all one piece.

 1988–1990 Buick Electra
 1988–1991 Buick LeSabre
 1988–1990 Buick Reatta
 1988–1990 Buick Riviera
 Formula Holden (motor racing category)
 1988–1991 Holden Commodore (VN Series I)
 1988.5–1991 Oldsmobile Delta 88
 1988-1990 Oldsmobile Ninety-Eight
 1988-1990 Oldsmobile Touring Sedan
 1988–1990 Oldsmobile Toronado
 1988–1990 Oldsmobile Toronado Trofeo
 1988–1991 Pontiac Bonneville

3300 (LG7)

A smaller 3.3 liter 3300 was introduced in 1989 and produced through 1993. Like the 3800, it used a cast iron block and heads, push rods, and hydraulic lifters. Unlike the 3800, however, it used a batch-fire injection system rather than sequential injection, as evidenced by the lack of a cam position sensor. It also did not have a balance shaft.

Applications:
 1989-1993 Buick Century
 1989-1993 Buick Skylark
 1992-1993 Pontiac Grand Am
 1992-1993 Oldsmobile Achieva
 1989-1991 Oldsmobile Calais
 1989-1993 Oldsmobile Cutlass Ciera

Series I

L27 SI Naturally Aspirated

The LN3 was replaced by the  L27 in 1991-1992 and produced  from 1992 onward, this engine was referred to as the Series I 3800, or 3800 TPI (Tuned Port Injection). In Australia, the LN3 was also replaced by the L27 by Holden who used the engine in their series 2 (1991) VN Commodore range. However, the Australian L27 retained the LN3's one piece upper intake and lower plenum. The L36 made its debut in 1995.

 1992–1995 Buick LeSabre
 1991–1994 Buick Park Avenue
 1991 Buick Reatta
 1990–1995 Buick Regal
 1991–1993 Buick Riviera
 1992–1995 Chevrolet Lumina APV
 1991–1995 Holden Commodore (VNII, VP, VR)
 Holden Caprice (VQ, VR)
 1992-1994 Pontiac Bonneville
 1992–1995 Pontiac Trans Sport
 1992-1994 Oldsmobile Eighty-Eight
 1992-1994 Oldsmobile Ninety-Eight
 1991–1992 Oldsmobile Toronado
 1991–1992 Oldsmobile Toronado Trofeo
 1992–1995 Oldsmobile Silhouette

L67 SI Supercharged
The Series I Supercharged engine went through 2 Supercharger revisions(Gen2&Gen3) and the horsepower improved between initial launch and the time that the Series II L36 was introduced. The M62 supercharger was manufactured by Eaton, for the GM 3800 SI engine. HP was rated at 205 for 1991-1993 engines (Gen2 supercharger) with a  pulley, and 225 for 1994-1995 engines(Gen3 Supercharger). All of the additional horsepower for 1994-95 Gen3 supercharged engines was gained by using epoxy (not Teflon as commonly believed) coated supercharger rotors to improve efficiency, a larger supercharger inlet and throttle body, Thus the 1994-1995 utilized a  pulley versus the  pulley on the Gen2. The easiest way to spot the difference between the Gen2 and Gen3 is the smaller pulley and the ribs on the side of the Gen2 extend all the way down the sides, while the Gen3 ribs stay on only the top, they perform slightly differently and interchanging one without tuning may result in strange behavior of the engine. Redline on Gen3 engines is at 6000rpm but the ECM will shift at 5400rpm without performance shift enabled.

Applications:

1991–1995:
 Buick Park Avenue Ultra
1992–1995:
 Oldsmobile Ninety-Eight Regency Elite (optional), Touring Sedan
 Pontiac Bonneville SE with H4U RPO, not badged - SLE (optional SC package), SSE (optional), and SSEi
1995 Only:
 Buick Riviera (optional)
 Oldsmobile Eighty-Eight LS (optional), LSS (optional)

Series II
Introduced in 1995, the Series II is quite a different engine. That said, the engine architecture was vastly changed. The deck height is shorter than the Series I, reducing weight and total engine package size. This required that the piston connecting rods be shortened , and the crankshaft was also redesigned. A new intake manifold improved breathing while a redesigned cylinder head featured larger valves and a higher compression ratio. This 3800 weighs only  more than the all-aluminum High Feature V6 that currently dominates GM's six-cylinder applications, despite being an all cast-iron design.

The new intake manifold greatly improved airflow. To meet emissions standards, an EGR tube was placed in the intake manifold to reduce combustion temperatures.

The 3800 Series II was on the Ward's 10 Best Engines list for 1995 through 1997.

GM recalled 1.5 million vehicles with this engine on April 14, 2009 due to risk of fire from engine oil leaking under the valve cover gaskets onto hot exhaust manifolds. The fire could spread to the nearby plastic spark plug wire retainers on the valve cover and then to the rest of the engine compartment. GM fitted the affected vehicles with redesigned spark plug wire retainers. These engines were noted for having problems with the plastic upper intake manifold cracking around the EGR passage. The engine would then hydrolock. The lower intake gaskets and upper intake manifolds were revised, correcting all these issues.

L36 SII Naturally Aspirated

 1996-2005 Buick LeSabre
 1995-2005 Buick Park Avenue
 1996-2004 Buick Regal LS
 1995-1997 Buick Riviera
 1995 California only, 1996-2002 Chevrolet Camaro
 2000-2005 Chevrolet Impala
 1998-1999 Chevrolet Lumina LTZ
 1999-2004 Chevrolet Omega CD
 1998-2005 Chevrolet Monte Carlo (Z34, LT, SS)
 1995-2004 Holden Commodore (VS, VT, VX, VY)
 Holden Caprice (VS, WH, WK)
 Holden Ute (VU, VY)
 1995-1996 Oldsmobile Ninety-Eight
 1995-1999 Oldsmobile Eighty-Eight
 1998-1999 Oldsmobile Intrigue
 1996-1998 Oldsmobile LSS
 1997-1998 Oldsmobile Regency
 1995-2005 Pontiac Bonneville
 1995 California only, 1996-2002 Pontiac Firebird
 1997-2003 Pontiac Grand Prix

L67 SII Supercharged

The L67 is the supercharged version of the 3800 Series II L36 and appeared in 1996, one year after the normally aspirated version. It uses the Eaton Generation III M90 supercharger with a  pulley, a larger throttle body, and different fuel injectors, different cylinder heads, as well as different lower intake manifold and pistons than the L36 uses. Both engines share the same engine blocks, but compression is reduced from 9.4:1 in the L36 to 8.5:1 for the L67. Final drive ratios are reduced in most applications, for better fuel economy and for improved use of the engine's torque in the low RPM range. Like most 3800 V6s, the engine is well known for its reliability and low maintenance costs. The engine is a popular choice for aftermarket modification thanks to its very strong internals and impressive power gains from basic upgrades. The engine was built in Flint, Michigan and was certified LEV in 2001.

 1996 Buick Park Avenue Ultra (C-body)
 1997–2005 Buick Park Avenue Ultra (G-body)
 1997.5–2004 Buick Regal GS / GSE / GSX (SLP)
 1996–1999 Buick Riviera (optional 1996-97, std. 1998-99)
 2004–2005 Chevrolet Impala SS
 2004–2005 Chevrolet Monte Carlo SS Supercharged
 1996–1999 Oldsmobile Eighty-Eight LSS (limited)
 1996–1999 Pontiac Bonneville SSEi (H-body)
 2000–2003 Pontiac Bonneville SSEi (G-body)
 1997–2003 Pontiac Grand Prix GTP / GTX (SLP)
 1996–2004 Holden Commodore VS (series II), VT, VX, VY
 1996-2004 Holden Caprice and Statesman VS (Series I, II & III), WH, WK
 2001–2004 Holden Monaro (V2) CV6

Series III
The Series III engines include many changes. The upper and lower intake manifold is now aluminum on the naturally aspirated models. Electronic throttle control is added to all versions, as is returnless fuel injection. Stronger powdered metal sinter forged connecting rods are used in 2004+ supercharged, and 2005+ naturally aspirated engines, instead of the cast iron style from Series II engines. Emissions are also reduced. In 2005, it was the first gasoline engine in the industry to attain SULEV (Super Ultra Low Emissions Vehicle) emissions certification.

Also note that Series III engines are the base for any 3800 produced for the 2004 year and up. This means the same block, heads, & connecting rods apply to any remaining Series II engines made after 2004 also. The difference is that Series III engines received the new superchargers (Generation 5 - Eaton M90 - if equipped), intake manifolds, fuel systems, powdered connecting rods, as well as larger intake valves, drive by wire throttle body and electronics.

L26 SIII Naturally Aspirated

The L26 is the Series III version of the 3800. It is still a  design. Compression remains at 9.4:1 as with the L36, but the aluminum upper and lower intake (2004+) and stronger connecting rods (2005+) are the primary physical changes. The powdered metal connecting rods were meant to be introduced in 2004 along with the L32, but the GM plant in Bay City, Michigan that supplies the Flint, Michigan plant could not achieve the desired production dates in time for that engine year.

This engine was used in the following vehicles:
 2004–2008 Pontiac Grand Prix
 2005–2009 Buick LaCrosse/Allure
 2006–2008 Buick Lucerne

L32 SIII Supercharged
The L32 is a supercharged Series III.
Introduced in 2004, the main differences between the L67 and the L32 are the L32's electronic throttle control, slightly improved cylinder head design, and updated Eaton supercharger, the Generation 5 M90.

As with the L67, premium fuel (91 octane or higher) is required, but the PCM can compensate for lower octane fuel at the cost of acceleration. The use of below 87 octane fuel can cause detonation that eventually leads to engine damage and failure.

Applications:
 2004–2005 Pontiac Grand Prix GTP
 2006–2007 Pontiac Grand Prix GT

Special Editions

Discontinuation
End of production of the 3800 V6 engine had been set by GM for January 1, 1999, but was extended to August 22, 2008. It was replaced by the LZ4 3500 OHV V6 in naturally aspirated applications, and the supercharged 3800 by the LY7 3.6L DOHC V6.

See also
 Buick V8 engine
 List of GM engines

References

External links

Brief early history of the engine
3800 history page at CanadianDriver.com

Buick engines
Dauntless
V6 engines